Eupithecia cinnamomata is a moth in the family Geometridae. It was described by David Stephen Fletcher in 1951 and it is found in South Africa.

References

Endemic moths of South Africa
Moths described in 1951
cinnamomata
Moths of Africa